Ahmir Khalib Thompson (born January 20, 1971), known professionally as Questlove (stylized as ), is an American musician, record producer, disc jockey, filmmaker, music journalist, and actor. He is the drummer and joint frontman (with Black Thought) for the hip hop band the Roots. The Roots have been serving as the in-house band for The Tonight Show Starring Jimmy Fallon since 2014, after having fulfilled the same role on Late Night with Jimmy Fallon. Questlove is also one of the producers of the cast album of the Broadway musical Hamilton. He is the co-founder of the websites Okayplayer and OkayAfrica. Additionally, he is an adjunct professor at the Clive Davis Institute of Recorded Music at New York University.

Questlove has produced recordings for artists including Elvis Costello, Common, D'Angelo, Jill Scott, Erykah Badu, Bilal, Jay-Z, Nikka Costa, and more recently, Booker T. Jones, Al Green, Amy Winehouse, and John Legend. He is a member of the production teams the Soulquarians, the Randy Watson Experience, the Soultronics, the Grand Negaz and the Grand Wizzards. As an author, he has written four books. Questlove is the recipient of many accolades, including an Academy Award, six Grammy Awards and a BAFTA Award.

Early life 
Ahmir Khalib Thompson was born into a musical family in Philadelphia on January 20, 1971. His father was Arthur Lee Andrews Thompson, from Goldsboro, North Carolina. A singer, he became known as Lee Andrews and was lead with Lee Andrews & the Hearts, a 1950s doo-wop group. Ahmir's mother, Jacquelin Thompson, together with his father, was also part of the Philadelphia-based soul group Congress Alley. His parents did not want to leave him with babysitters so they took him with them when they were on tour. He grew up in backstages of doo-wop shows. By the age of seven, Thompson began drumming on stage at shows, and by 13, had become a musical director.

Questlove's parents enrolled him at the Philadelphia High School for the Creative and Performing Arts. By the time he graduated, he had founded a band called the Square Roots (later dropping the word "square") with his friend Tariq Trotter (Black Thought). Questlove's classmates at the Philadelphia High School for the Creative and Performing Arts included Boyz II Men, jazz bassist Christian McBride, jazz guitarist Kurt Rosenwinkel, jazz organist Joey DeFrancesco, and singer Amel Larrieux. He attended senior prom with Larrieux. After graduating from high school, he took jazz and composition classes at the Settlement Music School.

Thompson began performing on South Street in Philadelphia using drums, while Tariq rhymed over his beats and rhythms. Thompson and Jay Lonick, a childhood friend, were known for improvisational "call and response" percussion battles with plastic buckets, crates, and shopping carts. This style translated into Thompson's usual drumset arrangement, with most drums and cymbals positioned at waist level, emulating his original street setups.

For the Okayplayer platform and web television OkayAfrica TV, Questlove had his DNA tested in 2011 and genealogists researched his family ancestry. Questlove's DNA revealed from both of his biological parents that he is of West African descent, specifically the Mende people (found mostly in Sierra Leone as well as Guinea and Liberia).

From the PBS television series, Finding Your Roots, hosted by Professor Henry Louis Gates Jr., Questlove learned in December 2017 that he was descended in part from Charles and Maggie Lewis, his three times great-grandparents, who had been taken captive in warfare and sold as slaves in the port of Ouidah, Dahomey (now Benin) to American ship captain William Foster. They were among 110 slaves smuggled illegally to Mobile, Alabama, in July 1860 on the Clotilda. It was the last known slave ship to carry slaves to the United States. Questlove is the only guest to have appeared on Gates's program to be descended from slaves known by name, ship, and where they came from in Africa.

Career

1993–1996: Beginnings with the Roots 

The Roots' lineup was soon completed, with Questlove on drums and percussion, Tariq Trotter and Malik B on vocals, Josh Abrams (Rubber Band) on bass (who was replaced by Leonard Hubbard in 1994), and Scott Storch on keyboards. While the group was performing a show in Germany, they recorded an album entitled Organix, released by Relativity Records in 1993.

The group continued recording, releasing two critically acclaimed records in 1995 and 1996, Do You Want More?!!!??! and Illadelph Halflife, respectively.

1997–2003: Breakthrough, Soulquarians era, and increased output 

In 1999, the Roots had mainstream success with "You Got Me" (featuring Erykah Badu); the song earned the band the Grammy Award for Best Rap Performance by a Duo or Group for 2000. The song helped fuel the success of their Things Fall Apart album, which has since been hailed as a classic, eventually selling platinum.

Questlove served as executive producer for D'Angelo's 2000 album Voodoo, Slum Village's album Fantastic, Vol. 2, and Common's albums Like Water for Chocolate and Electric Circus. Besides the aforementioned albums, he has also contributed as a drummer or producer to Erykah Badu's Baduizm and Mama's Gun, Dilated Peoples' Expansion Team, Blackalicious's Blazing Arrow, Bilal's 1st Born Second, N*E*R*D's Fly or Die, Joshua Redman's Momentum, and Zap Mama's Axel Norman Ancestry In Progress, Fiona Apple's Extraordinary Machine, and Zack De La Rocha's currently unreleased solo material.

In 2001, he collaborated as the drummer for The Philadelphia Experiment, a collaborative instrumental jazz album featuring Christian McBride and Uri Caine, and the DJ of the compilation Questlove Presents: Babies Making Babies, released on Urban Theory Records in 2002. He played drums on Christina Aguilera's song "Loving Me 4 Me" for her 2002 album Stripped. In 2002, he and the Roots released the critically acclaimed Phrenology, which went gold.

In 2003, he played drums on John Mayer's song "Clarity" from his second album Heavier Things. He also arranged and drummed on Joss Stone's cover of the White Stripes' "Fell in Love with a Girl".

2004–present: Continued output and other media endeavors 

In 2004, the Roots released The Tipping Point, which contained a more mainstream sound, allegedly due to demands from Interscope Records. The album sold 400,000 copies. In 2004, Questlove appeared in Jay-Z's Fade to Black. In addition to appearing in the documentary portion of the film, Questlove was the drummer/musical director for all portions of the show with a live band. In 2005, Questlove appeared along with performers including Madonna, Iggy Pop, Bootsy Collins, and Little Richard in a television commercial for the Motorola ROKR phone. Questlove also appears for a short clip in the 2005 film, The Longest Yard.

In 2006, Questlove appeared in the film Dave Chappelle's Block Party, as well as a couple of skits on Chappelle's Show. These included the Tupac "The Lost Episodes" skit, and one featuring John Mayer, wherein Questlove performs in a barber shop, inducing the occupants to dance and rap. With the exception of the Fugees and Jill Scott, Questlove served as the drummer at the 2004 Brooklyn street concert and was the musical director for the entire show. Questlove was given an Esky for Best Scribe in Esquire magazine's 2006 Esky Music Awards in the April issue. In 2006, Questlove was one of a handful of musicians hand-picked by Steve Van Zandt to back Hank Williams Jr. on a new version of "All My Rowdy Friends Are Coming Over Tonight" for the season premiere (and formal ESPN debut) of Monday Night Football. Along with his fellow Motorola ROKR commercial co-stars, Bootsy Collins and Little Richard, Questlove's bandmates included Rick Nielsen (Cheap Trick), Joe Perry (Aerosmith), Charlie Daniels, and Bernie Worrell.
In the same year, he appeared in the studio album Fly of the Italian singer Zucchero Fornaciari.

In 2007, Questlove co-produced with VH1's The Score winning producer Antonio "DJ Satisfaction" Gonzalez, from the Maniac Agenda, the theme to VH1's Hip Hop Honors 2007. Questlove joined Ben Harper and John Paul Jones for the Bonnaroo SuperJam on June 16, 2007, to play a 97-minute set.

On March 2, 2009, Questlove and the Roots began their run as house band for Late Night with Jimmy Fallon. He continues to perform with the Roots on The Tonight Show Starring Jimmy Fallon, continuing his duties from Late Night with Jimmy Fallon. He occasionally performed solos titled, 're-mixing the clips', where he drew on his production and DJ abilities to dub video clips, cue audio samples in rhythm, and play drum breaks simultaneously.

In late 2009, while serving as an associate producer of the hit Broadway play Fela!, Questlove recruited Jay-Z to come on board as a producer. It was reported that Will Smith and Jada Pinkett Smith had also signed on as producers.

In January 2010, he was writing material with British singer Duffy for her second album. He has been featured in a commercial for Microsoft's short-lived mobile phone, the Kin. In 2010, he made a cameo in the music video of Duck Sauce's song "Barbra Streisand", and with the Roots released the album Dilla Joints with renditions of producer J Dilla's music. He contributed drums to the song "You Got a Lot to Learn", which was recorded for the self-titled third studio album by Evanescence, but did not appear on the final release.

Questlove was planning to collaborate with Amy Winehouse before her death in July 2011. He said "We're Skype buddies, and she wants to do a project with Mos and me. Soon as she gets her visa thing together, that's gonna happen." Rolling Stone named Questlove number 2 in the 50 Top Tweeters in Music. In June 2011, Questlove played drums alongside the Roots bassist Owen Biddle for Karmin's cover of Nicki Minaj's "Super Bass." Questlove placed 8th in the Rolling Stone Readers Pick for Best Drummers of all Time.

In September 2016, Questlove launched a weekly radio show on Pandora, Questlove Supreme. Notable guests have included Solange, Chris Rock, Maya Rudolph, and Pete Rock, among others.

Questlove was interviewed by Alec Baldwin for the January 3, 2017, episode of Baldwin's WNYC podcast Here's the Thing, where he joked about being "obsessed" with his Wikipedia profile. During the interview, he also discussed his musical and cultural interests, how the Roots started a "movement" with three 15-passenger vans, and the impact of the loss of musical icons in 2016.

He also served as the musical director of both the 2020 and 2021 Academy Awards ceremony, in addition to being the show's in-house DJ. The music for the 2020 ceremony was largely remixed from compositions created by his band The Roots, with no in-house orchestra present.

In 2021, Questlove made his directorial debut with Summer of Soul (...Or, When the Revolution Could Not Be Televised), a film about the 1969 Harlem Cultural Festival, which featured performances by Stevie Wonder, Sly and The Family Stone, Nina Simone, Mahalia Jackson, Mavis Staples, B.B. King, and many other top Soul, Jazz, Gospel and Latin artists of the era. Summer of Soul won both the US Grand Jury Prize and the Audience Award for documentary at the 2021 Sundance Film Festival. Disney-owned Searchlight Pictures acquired the film for distribution, setting a new Sundance Film Festival record for documentary film acquisition price. The film received acclaim from critics, with particular praise given to the restoration of the footage used. The film won numerous awards, including Best Documentary Feature at the 6th Critics' Choice Documentary Awards, where it won in all six categories in which it was nominated, Best Documentary at the 75th British Academy Film Awards, Best Documentary Feature at the 94th Academy Awards, and Best Music Film at the 64th Annual Grammy Awards.

In September 2022, it was announced that Questlove would executive produce a feature documentary about J Dilla titled Dilla Time, adapted from the Dan Charnas biography of the same name. Joseph Patel, who also produced Summer of Soul, and Darby Wheeler are slated to co-direct.

Writing
In 2007 he provided the foreword for the book Check the Technique. On June 18, 2013, he released a memoir, Mo' Meta Blues: The World According to Questlove. On October 22, 2013, Harper Design published the Questlove-written book, Soul Train: The Music, Dance, and Style of a Generation.

Questlove released his third book, Something To Food About: Exploring Creativity with Innovative Chefs, along with co-author Ben Greenman and photographer Kyoko Hamada, which was published by Clarkson Potter Books on April 12, 2016. In 2018, Questlove curated the soundtrack The Michelle Obama Musiaqualogy for Michelle Obama's memoir Becoming. 

He also released the book Creative Quest, regarding the concept and cultivation of creativity, in April 2018. 

Questlove's next book, Music Is History, was published in December 2021 by Abrams Image.  The book explores popular music through the context of American history over the past fifty years, connecting issues of race, gender, politics, and identity with Questlove's point of view.

Filmography

Film

Television

References

Further reading

External links

1971 births
20th-century American drummers
21st-century American drummers
African-American DJs
African-American drummers
African-American film score composers
African-American record producers
Alternative hip hop musicians
American hip hop DJs
American hip hop record producers
American male drummers
American male film actors
American male film score composers
American film score composers
American male television actors
American male voice actors
American people of Beninese descent
American people of Mende descent
Best Original Score Guldbagge Award winners
Grammy Award winners
Living people
Musicians from Philadelphia
Philadelphia High School for the Creative and Performing Arts alumni
Record producers from Pennsylvania
Shorty Award winners
Soulquarians members
Sundance Film Festival award winners
The Roots members
The Tonight Show Band members
The Soultronics members
Directors of Best Documentary Feature Academy Award winners